James John Plant is an English professional footballer who plays as a winger for  club Salisbury, on loan from  club Port Vale. He has played on loan at Nantwich Town and Salisbury.

Career
Plant made his senior debut for Port Vale in a 1–0 victory over Stockport County in an EFL Trophy group stage game at Vale Park on 30 August 2022; he came on as an 86th-minute substitute for Tommy McDermott. On 24 September 2022, he joined Northern Premier League Premier Division club Nantwich Town on a work experience loan, having been recommended to joint-manager Ritchie Sutton, who said Plant would bring "energy, enthusiasm, quality and a great attitude" to the "Dabbers" squad. Plant made his debut later that day, and was named as man of the match in a 2–0 defeat at Whitby Town. He was praised by "Dabbers" supporters for his "creative playing style and energetic performances". On 31 January 2023, he joined Southern League Premier Division South club Salisbury on a work experience loan, alongside Tommy McDermott. He was named as Player of the Match in each of his first two appearances for Salisbury and scored on his fourth appearance, a 3–0 win at Hanwell Town.

Career statistics

References

Living people
People from Werrington, Staffordshire
English footballers
Association football wingers
Port Vale F.C. players
Nantwich Town F.C. players
Salisbury F.C. players
Northern Premier League players
Southern Football League players
Year of birth missing (living people)